Daniele Penzavalli (born 8 November 1968) is a retired Swiss football defender.

References

1968 births
Living people
Swiss men's footballers
FC Lugano players
AC Bellinzona players
FC Locarno players
Association football defenders
Swiss Super League players
Switzerland under-21 international footballers